Coláiste Íde agus Iosef, (colloquially referred to as CII), is a public secondary school in Abbeyfeale, County Limerick, Ireland. It was founded as a community college in 2011 and its catchment area extends into the counties of Limerick, Kerry and Cork.

References 

Secondary schools in County Limerick
2011 establishments in Ireland
Educational institutions established in 2011